Vaile is a surname. Notable people with the surname include:

Bobbie Vaile (1959–1996), Australian astronomer
Bryn Vaile, British yacht racer
Edward Earle Vaile (1869–1956), New Zealand farmer and philanthropist
Gertrude Vaile (1878-1954), American social worker
Mark Vaile (born 1956), Australian politician
William N. Vaile (1876–1927), American politician